Jiang Qinqin (born 3 September 1976) is a Chinese actress. She is sometimes credited as Shui Ling, a stage name given to her by Taiwanese writer Chiung Yao while she was involved in the production of the television series Tears in Heaven.

Career
Jiang started learning Beijing Opera at the age of 10 and entered the Beijing Film Academy in 1994 after attaining first place in the entrance examination. In the second year of Jiang's study at the Beijing Film Academy, she was cast by director Yang Jie in the title role of Xishi in the television series of the same name. 
She then starred in Tears in Heaven, an adaptation of a novel by Chiung Yao, and rose to fame in China.  
Following that, she played a number of notable roles, including Gu Manlu in Affair of Half a Lifetime (2003) and Mu Nianci in The Legend of the Condor Heroes (2003).
Jiang's performance in the historical drama Qiao's Grand Courtyard won her both Favorite TV Actress and the Audience's Favorite Actress Awards at the Golden Eagle TV Art Festival. Jiang has also starred in several films, notably My Sister’s Dictionary and Seven Nights, for which she was awarded at the Golden Phoenix Awards.

Personal life
Jiang married actor Chen Jianbin on February 22, 2006, whom she co-starred with in Qiao's Grand Courtyard. Their son was born on January 8, 2007.

Filmography

Film

Television series

Awards and nominations

References

External links

Jiang Qinqin's page on Sina

Actresses from Chongqing
Beijing Film Academy alumni
Living people
1975 births
Chinese stage actresses
Singers from Chongqing
Chinese film actresses
Chinese television actresses
21st-century Chinese actresses
20th-century Chinese actresses
21st-century Chinese women singers